Anne Plichota (born Dijon, 1968) is a French children's author. With her fellow Strasbourg librarian Cendrine Wolf she co-authored Oksa Pollock (2007-2013), a French fantasy series, and a second more "gothic" trilogy Susan Hopper (first novel published March 2013).

The two authors were originally refused by major publishing houses so self-published the first book and distributed it locally in Strasbourg. The series acquired a teen blog following and became a local phenomenon in Alsace, then throughout France. Then in translation in Germany and Spain. The Oksa series is published in English in the UK by Pushkin Press.

References

1968 births
Living people
French women novelists